Arrade destituta is a moth of the family Erebidae first described by Francis Walker in 1865. It is found in Queensland, Australia.

References

Hypeninae
Moths of Australia